Tectorigenin is an O-methylated isoflavone, a type of flavonoid. It can be isolated from leopard lily (Belamcanda chinensis), in Iris unguicularis or Pueraria thunbergiana.

Glycosides 
Tectoridin is the 7-glucoside of tectorigenin.

References 

O-methylated isoflavones
Resorcinols